Raranitiqa Island (also known as Rara ni Tinka or Tavuka) in Fiji, a member of the Ringgold Isles archipelago, which forms an outlier group to the northern island of Vanua Levu. It is located within the Budd Reef and large formations of rocks, known as the Gangway rocks, make navigation around the island dangerous at night.  It has a land area of 2.49 hectares. The southern part of the island has a "well-defined summit."

See also 

 Desert island
 List of islands

References 

Uninhabited islands of Fiji
Ringgold Isles